ʻElisiva Fusipala Taukiʻonetuku (18 May 1850 – September 1889) was the mother of King George Tupou II.

Biography 
Born to Tēvita ʻUnga and his first wife Fifita Vava'u, her father was, according to newly adopted Christian law, an illegitimate son of King George Tupou I because his mother was a secondary wife of the king. Her family's luck changed when the king's only legitimate son, Prince Vuna Takitakimālohi, died, leaving her father as King Tupou's heir.

She married her paternal first cousin Prince Siaʻosi Fatafehi Toutaitokotaha (1842–1912), the fourth Tuʻi Pelehake, grandson of Tupou I through his mother Princess Salote Pilolevu Mafileʻo, her aunt. They had one son, the future King George Tupou II. Her father died 1879, her elder brother ʻUelingatoni Ngū died childless in 1885 and the same fate befell her younger brother Nalesoni Laifone 1889. She became the heir to the throne after her last brother's death in 1889 and held the status of heir apparent for two months before her own death. Her son succeeded his great-grandfather in 1893. Thus the royal lineage passed through her. Her son's second daughter Princess ʻElisiva Fusipala Taukiʻonetuku was named after her.

In July 1865, English explorer Julius Brenchley visited Vavaʻu for five days and met governor ʻUnga and his family including Fusipala. Brenchley noted that she was "twelve years old, is strongly built, and has her breasts perfectly developed, as is usual in a country where the women are generally mothers before they are thirteen.  However, Fusipala was actually fifteen at the time, being born in 1850, and not twelve as Brenchley claimed.

Family tree

References

Bibliography 

1850 births
1889 deaths
Heirs apparent who never acceded
Tongan royalty
Tongan princesses
19th-century Tongan people
19th-century Tongan women